The 4th Massachusetts Regiment also known as 3rd Continental Regiment or Learned's Regiment, was raised on April 23, 1775, by Colonel Ebenezer Learned outside Boston, Massachusetts.

The regiment saw action at the Battle of Bunker Hill, New York Campaign, Battle of Trenton, Battle of Princeton, Battle of Saratoga, Battle of Monmouth and the Battle of Rhode Island. The regiment was disbanded on November 3, 1783, at West Point, New York.

See also
Deborah Sampson, a woman soldier who served in the 4th Massachusetts

External links
Bibliography of the Continental Army in Massachusetts compiled by the United States Army Center of Military History

Massachusetts regiments of the Continental Army